Peter Robin Brunyee (1939-2014), was a male athlete who competed for England.

Athletics career
He represented England in the 120 yards hurdles at the 1958 British Empire and Commonwealth Games in Cardiff, Wales. He was the first Worksop Harrier athlete to represent England.

References

1939 births
2014 deaths
English male sprinters
Athletes (track and field) at the 1958 British Empire and Commonwealth Games
Commonwealth Games competitors for England